Frederick Habberfield (5 February 1895 – 12 December 1943) was a British cyclist. He competed in two events at the 1924 Summer Olympics. He was killed in action during World War II.

Personal life
Habberfield served as a Canteen Manager in the Royal Navy Canteen Service during the Second World War. He is commemorated at Chatham Naval Memorial.

References

External links
 

1895 births
1943 deaths
Military personnel from London
British male cyclists
Olympic cyclists of Great Britain
Cyclists at the 1924 Summer Olympics
People from Kentish Town
Cyclists from Greater London
Royal  Navy personnel killed in World War II
Deaths due to shipwreck at sea
Royal Navy sailors